Tyndale Old Testament Commentaries (or TOTC) is a series of commentaries in English on the Old Testament. It is published by the Inter-Varsity Press.

Constantly being revised since its first being completed, the series seek to bridge the gap between brevity and scholarly comment.

Reviews

Titles
 - 496 pages
replaced -  - 240 pages
 - 288 pages
 - 336 pages
replaced -  - ? pages
 - 272 pages
 - 333 pages*
replaced -  - 349 pages
 - 336 pages
 - 336 pages
 - 320 pages
 - 336 pages
 - 274 pages
 - 304 pages
 - 176 pages
 - 176 pages
replaced -  - ? pages
 - 318 pages
 - 479 pages
replaced  - 196 pages
replaced  - 529 pages
 - 192 pages
 - 176 pages
 - 160 pages
 - 432 pages 
 - 373 pages 
replaced  - 240 pages
 - 277 pages 
 - 224 pages 
 - 240 pages 
 - 256 pages 
 - 224 pages 
 - 144 pages 
 - 368 pages

See also 
 Tyndale New Testament Commentaries
 Exegesis

References

External links 
 IVP's publisher Tyndale Old Testament Commentary — official page of series at publisher's site.

Biblical commentaries